The Bremer Pokal is an annual football cup competition, held by the . It is one of the 21 regional cup competitions in Germany and a qualifying competition for the German Cup, with the winner of the competition being automatically qualified for the first round of the German Cup in the following season. For sponsorship reasons, the competition is known as the Lotto-Pokal.

The record winners of the competition are SV Werder Bremen II, with 20 titles to their name, but the team is now barred from entering the cup competition, like all reserve teams in Germany since 2008.

Mode
The competition is open for all member clubs of the Bremen FA from the Regionalliga Nord, Bremen-Liga, Landesliga Bremen and the Bezirks- and Kreisligen. Reserve teams are not permitted to compete anymore, making it impossible for SV Werder Bremen II to add to its record total of 20 wins. The competition is staged separately for Bremen and Bremerhaven, with the two regions joining from the quarter finals onwards, whereby two slots are allocated to Bremerhaven for this round while the remaining six clubs come from Bremen. Regardless of which club has been drawn first, clubs from a lower league will always have home advantage when playing a club from a higher league. In case of a draw after regular time, no extra time is played and the game instead decided through a penalty shoot out.

The cup final is to be held at a neutral venue with the location to be determined by the Bremen FA. The cup winner automatically qualifies for the first round of the German Cup.

Winners
The winners of the competition:

 No competition held in 1961, 1962 and 1979.
 1 TuS Bremerhaven merged with a number of other local clubs in 1972 to form OSC Bremerhaven.

References

Sources
Deutschlands Fußball in Zahlen,  An annual publication with tables and results from the Bundesliga to Verbandsliga/Landesliga, publisher: DSFS

External links
BFV – Bremen Football Association 
 Official DFB results website
Bremen Cup summary - SOCCERWAY

Football cup competitions in Germany
Football competitions in Bremen (state)
Recurring sporting events established in 1951
1951 establishments in West Germany